Elizabeth Michael (Lulu) (born April 16, 1995) is a Tanzanian actress. In 2013, she won the Zanzibar International Film Festival award for Best Actress for "Woman Of Principles". She also won 2016 Africa Magic Viewers Choice Awards for Best Movie Eastern Africa. In August 2017, Africa Youth Awards named her among the 100 Most Influential Young Africans. In November 2017, she was convicted of involuntary manslaughter for the 2012 death of Steven Kanumba and sentenced to two years in prison. On April 26, 2018, on Tanzanian Union celebration, she was among of the prisoners who were pardoned by President John Pombe Magufuli where her sentence was reduced. She was later released on May 9, 2018 after serving six months in prison to do community services for the remaining time after showing good behavior while she was in prison. On 12 November 2018 she completed her probation.

Early life and education
Michael was born and raised in Dar Es Salaam, Tanzania. Her father is Michael Kimemeta, and her mother is Lucrecia Kalugira. She attended Remnant Academy for her primary education, and Perfect Vision High School, St Mary's High School for her secondary education. She then joined Tanzania Public Service College where she obtained her  diploma in Human Resource Management.

Career

Acting career
Michael started her acting career as a child actor when she was only five years old. Actor Mahsein Awadh (Dr Cheni) was the one who discovered her during his talent search. He took her to Kaole Sanaa Group, where she appeared in many television soap operas where she first appeared in Dira  where she played Nemu, she appeared in other soap operas including Zizimo, Baragumu, Gharika, Taswira, and Demokrasia that were well known during the 2000s. She performed under the name Lulu, a name under which she is commonly known today. In 2005, she made her film debut in the action film called Misukosuko.

Michael has participated in many big projects such as Wahapahapa Radio Drama of 2009 that was produced by Media for Development International Tanzania. She played Mainda in the story that tells the importance of parent-child communication in protecting youth as they navigate through the difficult period of adolescence. The project was directed by Jordan Riber from MFDI. Her subsequent movies include Family Tears, Ripple of Tears, Oxygen, House Boy, and Woman Of Principles. She has appeared in more than 30 films.

In August 2013, she launched the movie Foolish Age, which was her first effort as a producer. The event took place at Mlimani City Conference Hall in Dar Es Salaam, Tanzania. The movie was screened at the 2014 Zanzibar International Film Festival, Foolish Age was nominated as Favourite Movie at the 2014 Tanzania People's Choice Awards (Tuzo Za Watu) and Michael won Favourite Actress for her performance in the film.

In 2015, she released her second movie as producer called Mapenzi Ya Mungu (God's love) which she also played as a leading character . The movie was screened at the 2015 Zanzibar International Film Festival and the movie won the 2016 Africa Magic Viewers Choice Awards as the Best Movie Eastern Africa.

In July 2016, she launched her another movie called Ni Noma which she produced and starred as a leading character . The movie was sold via a mobile app called ProinBox.

Personal life
In October 2018, Michael became engaged to Francis Ciza (Dj Majizzo) the owner of EFM Radio and TVE. The couple held their marriage on 17 February 2021.  In July 2021, they had a son named Genesis. In Dec 2022 they had a daughter named Gracious

Brand associations, endorsements and ambassadorship
In 2013, Michael was selected as official ambassador for Dar Es Salaam Film Festival DFF in Dar Es Salaam. Her film, Foolish Age, was also screened at that festival.
In February 2014, she signed with Airtel Tanzania to be the host of the TV show Airtel Yatosha TV Show.
In 2015, she signed a brand ambassadorship deal with Paisha Tanzania to be the brand ambassador of the mobile app Paisha that deals with online business.
In 2016, she was named by Hengan Baby Products and Sanitary Co. Ltd. (Tanzania) to be the ambassador of Freestyle pads (napkins).
In October 2017 she was named by Azam Media Tanzania through their channel of cinemas, Sinema Zetu, to be the official ambassador of the Sinema Zetu International Film Festival (SZIFF).

In March 2019 she was the official host of Sinema Zetu International Film Festival (SZIFF2019)
In February 2020 she signed a contract with Multichoice Tanzania to become a brand ambassador of Dstv 
In 2020 she signed a contract with Azania Company Ltd  to become a brand ambassador of Azania Flour
From 2020-2021 she was a brand ambassador of Tecno Mobile in Tanzania

Manslaughter conviction, pardoning, and probation 
On 13 November 2017, Michael was convicted in High Court of Tanzania for involuntary manslaughter and sentenced to two years in prison for the 2012 death of actor Steven Kanumba, whom she had been dating when she was a juvenile (17 years old).

Michael was alleged to have caused the death of 28-year old Kanumba. The death was said to have occurred after Kanumba confronted Michael for talking to another man in front of him. Michael was arrested and stayed in remand for almost a year for investigation. Later, the charges were amended to involuntary manslaughter. Member of Parliament Halima Mdee arranged for lawyers Peter Kibatala and Kennedy Fungamtama to represent Michael, because she believed she was innocent. In January 2013 Michael was granted bail.

In October 2017, Michael testified to the High Court that after Kanumba confronted her for talking to another man, he took her to his room by force and starting beating her with a sword while he was intoxicated. She admitted during her testimony that she was the last person to be with Kanumba, and claimed that Kanumba began breathing fast and collapsed while beating her, hitting his head. She said after Kanumba fell down she used the opportunity to escape, unaware that he had died. She left the area and was later arrested without knowing what she was being arrested for. She said she found out the second day after her arrest by Oysterbay Police in Dar Es Salaam. The officers that arrested Michael found that she had injuries consistent with sword wounds as they were arresting her. A postmortem report from Muhimbili National Hospital of Tanzania concluded that Kanumba's death was caused by brain concussion as the result of difficulty in breathing in conjunction with excessive drinking.

On April 26, 2018 Michael was among the prisoners who were pardoned by President John Pombe Magufuli whereby she was deducted 1/4 of her imprisonment. In May 2018 she was released from the prison by the High Court of Tanzania under the Tanzania Community Services Act of 2002, and the remaining time by doing community services after showing good behavior when she was in prison. In November 12, 2018 she completed her probation.

Humanitarian work
On January 23, 2019 Michael started the campaign called “Save My Valentine” which aimed to raise money for helping people with special needs. Through the campaign Michael sold part of her clothes so as to collect a certain amount of money, she sold her 62 clothes and the money obtained were taken to the some of the orphanage centers in Iringa Tanzania during the Valentine’s Day

Filmography

Television

Radio drama series

Movies

Awards and nominations

References

External links 

 
 
 

1995 births
Living people
Tanzanian film actresses
People from Dar es Salaam
People convicted of manslaughter
21st-century Tanzanian actresses
Tanzanian television actresses
Tanzanian radio actresses